Hemshin may refer to:

Hemshin peoples in Western Asia
Hemşin, also known as Hamshen or Hamamashen, a town and district now in Turkey the historical homeland of the Hemshin peoples